Syarpu lake (Nepali: स्यार्पु ताल)is located in Rukum district of western Nepal at an altitude of 1372 m. The surface area of the lake is about 2.6 km2. The lake drains to the Bheri River.  The lake is used for high-alitude fish farming.

To promote tourism in the area, an observation tower was constructed  by Nepal Army at a cost of NPR 500,000.

Due to human encroachment and several landslides the area of the land was found to be decreasing. Construction of a ring road around the lake have also degraded the lake.

See also
List of lakes of Nepal

References

Lakes of Karnali Province